Androchela is a genus of moths in the family Geometridae erected by Peter B. McQuillan in 1996.

Species
Androchela milvaria Guenée, [1858]
Androchela newmannaria Guenée, [1858]
Androchela smithi McQuillan, 1996

References

Nacophorini
Geometridae genera